The Trento–Malè–Mezzana railway is a metre gauge electric railway originally connecting Trento and Malè in Trentino, northern Italy. In 2002 it was extended to the Marilleva ski resort in the Italian Alps and in 2016 to Mezzana. FTM transports 2 million passengers per year along its  line, including tourists.

History
In 1891 a proposal for a new railway in Trentino (then part of the Austrian Empire was issued by Paolo Oss Mazzurana, mayor of Trento. Construction began in 1907 and the railway was inaugurated in 1909 as a  narrow-gauge tramway, electrified at 800 V DC (converted to 3,000 V DC in 1964).

After the end of World War I, the Trentino was given to Italy, the railway was acquired by the Ferrovie dello Stato, and then established as an independent company in 1936. The line was almost totally rebuilt, shortened by  but assuming the character of a true railway without road-embedded sections. In 1945 it passed under a new public company, Società Locale Trento Malè, who controlled it until 2002, when it became part of Trentino trasporti.

Gallery

External links
Homepage of Trentino Trasporti 
History of the Trento-Malè line 
History of the Trento-Malè line, by Gregory Beecroft
FTM at Tyrolian Museum Trains 

Mountain railways
Railway companies of Italy
Railway lines in Trentino-Alto Adige/Südtirol
Transport in Trentino
Metre gauge railways in Italy